Francisco Fernández Ordóñez (22 June 1930 – 7 August 1992) was a Spanish politician who was the minister of foreign affairs in the Spanish Socialist Workers' Party (PSOE) government of Felipe González from 1985 until shortly before his death from a terminal illness in 1992.

Early life and education
Fernández Ordóñez was born on 22 June 1930. He studied law in Madrid and at Harvard University.

Career

Minister of Finance and Justice
After graduation, Fernández Ordóñez joined the ministry of economy in 1959, becoming the assistant secretary in 1973 and president of the National Institute of Industry in 1974, but resigned the same year for political reasons. He then founded the tiny Social Democratic Party. In 1977, his party joined the larger Union of the Democratic Centre (UCD), led by Adolfo Suárez, serving under him as the finance minister from 1977 until 1980, and then as the minister of justice, in which position he legalized divorce.

Foreign Affairs
In 1982 he resigned from office and from the UCD in protest over a case of police torture, creating the small, new Democratic Action Party (Spain) (PAD). He then joined the Spanish Socialist Workers' Party (PSOE), becoming one of its deputies in the Cortes Generales when it won the general election of 28 October 1982. He was made president of the Banco Exterior de España until 1986 and was made later minister of foreign affairs. In the Congress he sat as a deputy for Madrid from 1977 to 1979 and from 1982 onwards and represented Zaragoza between 1979 and 1982.

Later life
Fernández Ordóñez died on 7 August 1992 of cancer at the age of 62.

References

External links
 Biography at Spanish Congress site.

1930 births
1992 deaths
Economy and finance ministers of Spain
Foreign ministers of Spain
Harvard Law School alumni
Members of the constituent Congress of Deputies (Spain)
Members of the 1st Congress of Deputies (Spain)
Members of the 2nd Congress of Deputies (Spain)
Members of the 3rd Congress of Deputies (Spain)
Justice ministers of Spain
Spanish Socialist Workers' Party politicians
Union of the Democratic Centre (Spain) politicians